Michalovce District (okres Michalovce) is a district in
the Košice Region of eastern Slovakia. 
Until 1918, the district was split between the county of Kingdom of Hungary of Zemplín (in the west) and Uh (in the east).

Municipalities

References

 
Geography of Košice Region
Districts of Slovakia